The IIHF All-Time Teams are the All-Time Teams of the countries that would have participated at the 2020 IIHF World Championship. To honor the 100-year anniversary of the Ice Hockey World Championships.

List

References

All-Time Teams
Ice hockey trophies and awards
+